The Florida Third District Court of Appeal is headquartered in Miami, Florida.  Its ten judges have jurisdiction over cases arising from Miami-Dade and Monroe Counties.

History
The Third District Court of Appeal (DCA) was one of the first three DCAs created by the Florida legislature in 1957.  Court was first held in a room of the University of Miami School of Law.  Then, from 1960 to 1976, court sessions took place at the State Office Building.  It wasn't until 1976 that the court finally had its own facility to conduct its business.  This courthouse was dedicated by Governor Reubin Askew in the fall of 1976.  In 1990 an addition was added to keep pace with the court's continued growth.  The courthouse has won the recognition of the American Institute of Architects (South Florida Chapter) and in 1981 Governor Bob Graham gave the court the Governor's Design Award.

The court's original three judges (Charles A. Carroll, Mallory H. Horton and Tillman Pearson) have increased to ten as of 2010.

Chief Judges
Judges who have served as Chief Judge of the Third DCA include:

Ivan F. Fernandez, Current Chief Judge since July 1, 2021
Kevin Emas, January 10, 2019 to June 30, 2021
Barbara Lagoa, January 1, 2019 to January 8, 2019
Leslie B. Rothenberg, July 1, 2017 to December 30, 2018
Richard Suarez, July 9, 2015 to June 30, 2017
Frank A. Shepherd, July 1, 2013 to July 8, 2015
Linda Ann Wells, July 1, 2011 to June 30, 2013
David M. Gersten, July 1, 2007 until June 30, 2009
Gerald B. Cope, Jr., July 1, 2005 to June 30, 2007
Alan R. Schwartz, 1983 to 2004
Phillip A. Hubbart, 1980 to 1983
Robert M. Haverfield, 1978 to 1980
Norman Hendry, 1965 to 1967 and 1977
Thomas H. Barkdull, Jr., 1963 to 1965 and 1967 to 1976
Tillman Pearson, 1961 to 1963
Mallory H. Horton, 1959 to 1961
Charles A. Carroll, 1957 to 1959

Active Judges
Judges serving on the Third DCA as of July 1, 2017 include:

Retired Judges
Judges who have served on the Third DCA include:

The Florida Third District Court of Appeal Nominating Commission
Marcos D. Jimenez, Chair (2011)
Jeffrey S. Bass (2014)
Hector J. Lombana (2014)
Peter Prieto (2014)
Matias R. Dorta (2011)
Timothy J. Koenig (2011)
Nilda Pedrosa (2012)
Lauri Waldman Ross (2012)
Lilly Ann Sanchez (2012)

Notable cases
In re Gill (2010) (Cope, J.) Text of the Court of Appeal decision : This ruling struck down the Florida’s statutory ban on gay and lesbian people adopting children in the state.
Engle v. Liggett Group (2003) (Gersten, J.) Text of the Court of Appeal decision: This ruling was overturned in 2006 by the Florida Supreme Court  which ordered decertification of a class action lawsuit against big tobacco companies that effectively reversed the largest punitive damage jury award, $145 billion, in U.S. history.

See also
 Florida District Courts of Appeal (for history and general overview)
 Florida First District Court of Appeal 
 Florida Second District Court of Appeal
 Florida Fourth District Court of Appeal 
 Florida Fifth District Court of Appeal

External links
Website of the Florida District Courts of Appeal
Florida Third District Court of Appeal Website
The Florida Third District Court of Appeal Nominating Commission 
Inside the Third District Court of Appeal

References

Florida appellate courts
1957 establishments in Florida
Courts and tribunals established in 1957